The 2015 Sevenoaks District Council election took place on 7 May 2015 to elect members of the Sevenoaks District Council in England. It was held on the same day as other local elections.

The Conservative Party retained their majority on the council, winning 49 of the 54 seats. The Liberal Democrats won two seats and the Labour Party and UKIP won one seat each. One seat was won by an Independent candidate.

Boundary changes triggered by the Sevenoaks (Electoral Changes) Order 2014 came into force at this election. The wards which were affected were: Hartley and Hodsoll Street; Ash and New Ash Green; Otford and Shoreham; Enysford; Swanley Christchurch and Swanley Village; Hextable; Leigh and Chiddingstone Causeway; Penshurst, Fordcombe and Chiddingstone; Brasted, Chevening and Sundridge; and Westerham and Crockham Hill.

Summary results

Ward results

Ash and New Ash Green

Brasted, Chevening and Sundridge

Cowden and Hever

Crockenhill and Well Hill

Dunton Green and Riverhead

Edenbridge North and East

Edenbridge South and West

Eynsford

Farningham, Horton Kirby and South Darenth

Fawkham and West Kingsdown

Halstead, Knockholt and Badgers Mount

Hartley and Hodsoll Street

Hextable

Kemsing

Leigh and Chiddingstone Causeway

Otford and Shoreham

Penhurst, Fordcombe and Chiddingstone

Seal and Weald

Sevenoaks Eastern

Sevenoaks Kippington

Sevenoaks Northern

Sevenoaks Town and St John's

Swanley Christchurch and Swanley Village

Swanley St Mary's

Swanley White Oak

Westerham and Crockham Hill

Notes

References

2015 English local elections
May 2015 events in the United Kingdom
2015
2010s in Kent